A technology center or technology centre is a research center used for technology research.

Technology Center may also refer to:
 Arnold R. Burton Technology Center
 Beaver Technology Center
 Canadian Valley Technology Center
 Community technology center
 Entertainment Technology Center
 Francis Tuttle Technology Center
 Gordon Cooper Technology Center
 High Plains Technology Center
 Jackson Technology Center
 Linux Technology Center
 Macomb Mathematics Science Technology Center
 Metro Technology Center
 Miami Valley Career Technology Center
 National Law Enforcement and Corrections Technology Center
 National Space Science and Technology Center
 Northwest Technology Center
 Pioneer Technology Center
 Pittsburgh Technology Center
 Reese Technology Center
 Religious Technology Center
 Technology Center (Washington & Jefferson College)
 Tulsa Technology Center
 Watson Technology Center
 Western Technology Center
 Transportation Technology Center (TTC), a federal railway testing facility
 Transportation Technology Center, Inc., a private contractor operating the TTC for the federal government

See also
 Advanced Technology College, a technology school in Daytona Beach, FL that previously used the "Advanced Technology Center" name
 List of technology centers
 Telecentre